Lt. Gen. (Retd.) Tejpal Singh Rawat is an Indian politician belonging to the Indian National Congress in the state of Uttarakhand. He was a member of 14th Lok Sabha. He was elected from Garhwal Parliamentary constituency of Uttarakhand in 2008 by-poll as a candidate of Bharatiya Janata Party. He is a Retired Lt. Gen. from the Indian army. He was decorated with PVSM and VSM. After retirement in 2000 he joined politics and elected to Uttarakhand Legislative Assembly in 2002 from Dhumakot Assembly constituency.

Positions held

References 

Uttarakhand MLAs 2002–2007
Indian generals
India MPs 2004–2009
Military personnel from Uttarakhand
Living people
Lok Sabha members from Uttarakhand
Recipients of the Param Vishisht Seva Medal
Bharatiya Janata Party politicians from Uttarakhand
Year of birth missing (living people)